The 2018 Fuzion 100 Southsea Trophy was a professional tennis tournament played on outdoor grass courts. It was the second edition of the tournament and was part of the 2018 ITF Women's Circuit. It took place in Southsea, United Kingdom, on 25 June–1 July 2018.

Singles main draw entrants

Seeds 

 1 Rankings as of 18 June 2018.

Other entrants 
The following players received a wildcard into the singles main draw:
  Katie Boulter
  Gabriella Taylor

The following player received entry as an alternate:
  Renata Voráčová

Champions

Singles

 Kirsten Flipkens def.  Katie Boulter, 6–4, 5–7, 6–3

Doubles

 Kirsten Flipkens /  Johanna Larsson def.  Alicja Rosolska /  Abigail Spears, 6–4, 3–6, [11–9]

External links 
 2018 Fuzion 100 Southsea Trophy at ITFtennis.com
 Official website

2018 ITF Women's Circuit
2018 in English women's sport
2018 in English tennis
Southsea Trophy